Ironhead Airport  is a public airport located three miles (4.8 km) southwest of the central business district (CBD) of Sanger, in Denton County, Texas, United States.

The airport is used solely for general aviation purposes. It is not an army operated or controlled base. Civil forces have used it before, but they asked permission from the owners.
The airport is a grass strip and is closed at dawn and dusk. It is also closed when it is too wet to take off or land.

Facilities 
Ironhead Airport has one runway:
 Runway 18/36: 2,500 x 200 ft. (762 x 61 m), Surface: Turf

External links

Airports in Texas
Airports in the Dallas–Fort Worth metroplex
Transportation in Denton County, Texas
Buildings and structures in Denton County, Texas